Events in the year 2018 in Benin.

Incumbents
President: Patrice Talon
President of the National Assembly: Adrien Houngbédji

Events

Deaths

4 January – Rafiatou Karimou, politician and teacher (b. 1946).

References

 
2010s in Benin
Years of the 21st century in Benin
Benin
Benin